Odorrana jingdongensis is a species of frogs in the family Ranidae. It is known from southern China (western and southern Yunnan, southern Guangxi) and northern Vietnam (Tùng Vài forest in Hà Giang Province and Fansipan in Lào Cai Province), though it quite likely also occurs in the adjacent areas in Laos and in Myanmar. Its name refers to its type locality, Jingdong Yi Autonomous County in Yunnan. Common name Jingdong frog has been coined for it.

Description
Males measure  and females  in snout–vent length; on average, adult males measure  and adult females  in snout–vent length. The tympanum is distinct. The toes are fully webbed and the toe discs are large. The dorsum is scattered with tubercles and large warts. The lips and sides of the head bear white spines. Lips have vertical bars. The dorsum is mostly green with brown and black spots.

Habitat and conservation
Breeding takes place in streams where also the tadpoles develop.

The species is threatened by habitat loss and overexploitation for food. Previously common, it is now reported to be rare. Its range overlaps with some protected areas.

References

jingdongensis
Frogs of China
Amphibians of Vietnam
Amphibians described in 2001
Taxonomy articles created by Polbot